The Cégep de Saint-Félicien is a CEGEP located at 1105 boulevard Hamel, Saint-Félicien, Quebec, Canada.

History
The college traces its origins to the merger of several institutions which became public ones in 1967, when the Quebec system of CEGEPs was created. The college was founded in 1971.

Programs

Technical Programs

 Processing of Forest Products
 First aid care
 Nature Technique
 Administration
 Information
 Tourism

Pre-University Programs

 Natural Science
 Human Science
 Arts and Letters
 Sciences, Letters and Arts

See also
List of colleges in Quebec
Higher education in Quebec

External links
Official website 

Quebec CEGEP
Education in Saguenay–Lac-Saint-Jean
Educational institutions established in 1971
Buildings and structures in Saguenay–Lac-Saint-Jean
1971 establishments in Quebec